Rajpur Assembly constituency is one of the 230 Vidhan Sabha (Legislative Assembly) constituencies of the central Indian state of Madhya Pradesh.

It is part of Barwani District.

Members of Legislative Assembly

Election results

2013 results

See also
Rajpur, Madhya Pradesh

References

Assembly constituencies of Madhya Pradesh